Harriet Scott Chessman (born January 16, 1951) is an American author of four novels, including Lydia Cassatt Reading the Morning Paper, a #1 Booksense Pick, Someone Not Really Her Mother, a Good Morning America book club choice, and The Beauty of Ordinary Things. Chessman's subjects often center on mortality, love, trauma, and the restorative power of art.

Biography
Harriet Scott Chessman grew up in the Welsh Hills of Ohio. She received her PhD in English from Yale University in 1979, and her B.A. cum laude from Wellesley College in 1972.  She has taught literature and creative writing at Yale University, Bread Loaf School of English, and Stanford University's Continuing Studies Program.  She lived for twelve years in Palo Alto, California, with her husband Bryan J. Wolf, the Jeannette and William Hayden Jones Professor in American Art and Culture at Stanford University. She now lives in Connecticut.

Bibliography

Novels
 Ohio Angels (1999)
 Lydia Cassatt Reading the Morning Paper (2001)  
 Someone Not Really Her Mother (2004)
 The Beauty of Ordinary Things (2013)

Scholarly works
 The Public is Invited to Dance: Representation, The Body, and Dialogue in Gertrude Stein (1989)
 Gertrude Stein: Writings (2 volumes), Library of America, co-editor (1995)

Libretti
 My Lai (2022)

References

External links 

1951 births
Living people
20th-century American novelists
21st-century American novelists
20th-century American women writers
21st-century American women writers
American women novelists
Writers from the San Francisco Bay Area